Gilten may refer to the following places:

Gilten, Germany, a municipality in the district of Heidekreis, in the state of Lower Saxony, Germany
Gilten (lake), a lake in the municipality of Steinkjer in Trøndelag county, Norway
Gilten (card game), traditional Austrian card game still played today in the Tyrol